Urban Design Associates (UDA; formerly known as UDA Architects) is an international urban design and architecture firm headquartered in Pittsburgh, Pennsylvania, United States.

History
Urban Design Associates (UDA) was founded in 1964 by David Lewis, FAIA, and Raymond Gindroz, FAIA, as one of the earliest architecture firms to concentrate on the design of neighborhoods and cities. Lewis and Gindroz pioneered methods for engaging citizens in the design of community centers, schools, and neighborhoods.

The firm is known for refining and developing public planning process and authored The Urban Design Handbook, Techniques and Working Methods, a textbook published by W. W. Norton & Company. UDA has advanced urban design as an important branch of the architecture profession, and co-founder David Lewis was influential in creating the Regional Urban Design Assistance Team (R/UDAT) service of the American Institute of Architects, and organized the "Remaking Cities" conference that was held in Pittsburgh in 1988 to address post-industrial cities. UDA co-founder Ray Gindroz was also a founding member of the Congress for the New Urbanism and was influential in formulating policies and standards with the United States Department of Housing and Urban Development and the Congress for the New Urbanism for the design of mixed-income neighborhoods under the federal HOPE VI program. UDA has been recognized for resurrecting the pattern book as a regulatory design tool for developers and municipalities as indicated in The Architectural Pattern Book, A Tool for Building Great Neighborhoods. UDA-authored pattern books include Celebration, Florida, and WaterColor, Florida, in the United States, and Ellon, Aberdeenshire, in Scotland.

Developments
The Urban Design Associates portfolio of work includes urban design, transit, and community development projects working with local and regional governmental authorities and private developers in North America, Europe, and Eurasia. Sample projects include:

 Alexander Street Corridor Design Guidelines, Yonkers, New York   
 Anderson Station, Calgary, Alberta, Canada
 Baxter Village Pattern Book, Fort Mill, South Carolina
 Celebration Pattern Book, Celebration, Florida
 Cincinnati Central Riverfront, Ohio
 Clarksburg Municipal Building, Clarksburg, West Virginia
 Crawford Square, Pittsburgh, Pennsylvania
 Currie Barracks, Calgary, Alberta, Canada
 Daybreak, Utah: Master Planners, Pattern Book
 Dayton, Ohio (various parts of city)
 Diggs Town, Norfolk, Virginia
 Downtown Norfolk, Virginia 
 Ellon Pattern Book, Aberdeenshire, Scotland, UK
 Federal District, Moscow, Russian Federation
 Jacksonville Landing, Jacksonville, Florida 
 Louisiana Speaks: Pattern Book & Tool Kit, Louisiana Region
 Middletown Arch, Norfolk, Virginia
 The New Faubourg Lafitte, New Orleans, Louisiana
 Park DuValle, Louisville, Kentucky 
 Randolph Neighborhood, Richmond, Virginia 
 Sewickley Heights Pattern Book, Sewickley Heights, Pennsylvania
 Tampa Waterfront Vision Plan, Tampa, Florida
 Virginia Beach Form-Based Code, Virginia Beach, Virginia
 WaterColor Pattern Book, WaterColor, Florida
 West Don Lands, Toronto, Ontario, Canada
 Yuzhny Master Plan, St. Petersburg, Russian Federation

Founders

 David Lewis, FAIA, co-founder - Lewis is credited for inspiring the Remaking Cities Institute (RCI) at Carnegie Mellon University. In 2007 the Heinz Endowments issued an endowment in his name.
 Raymond L. Gindroz, FAIA, co-founder - The "Gindroz Prize" for Carnegie Mellon architecture and music students carries his name.
 Donald K. Carter, FAIA, FAICP, LEED AP, emeritus key principal

Key employees

 Barry J. Long Jr., AIA, LEED AP, principal and CEO
 Rob Robinson, AIA, chairman
 Paul B. Ostergaard, FAIA AoU, senior vice president
 Eric R. Osth, AIA, LEED AP, vice chairman

Awards and recognitions

American Institute of Architects 
 1988, Edward C. Kemper Award, David Lewis
 2014, Honor Award, Regional and Urban Design, East Baltimore Comprehensive Redevelopment Plan, Baltimore, Maryland
 2000, Honor Award, Regional and Urban Design, Park DuValle, Louisville, Kentucky
 1999, Honor Award, Regional and Urban Design, Diggs Town Public Housing, Norfolk, Virginia
 2019, AIA Presidential Citation for Exceptional Service, David Lewis, FAIA, Urban Design Associates
 Citation For Excellence, Urban Design, Patching and Stitching in Urban Neighborhoods: Pittsburgh, Norfolk, and Richmond

Congress for the New Urbanism 
 2003, Charter Award, East Baltimore Comprehensive Redevelopment Plan, Baltimore, Maryland
 2004, Charter Award, The Campus Plan for the University of California Santa Barbara, Santa Barbara, California
 2005, Charter Award, A Pattern Book for Norfolk Neighborhoods, Norfolk, Virginia
 2006, Athena Award, David Lewis
 2007, Charter Awards,  Louisiana Speaks: Pattern Book, State of Louisiana
 2007, Recognition, Cooper's Crossing Pattern Book, Camden, New Jersey 
 2008, Recognition, A Pattern Book for Neighborly Houses/Habitat for Humanity
 2012, Recognition, Neighborhoods of the Lower Mill Creek Valley, Cincinnati, Ohio
 2012, Charter Award, New Faubourg Lafitte, New Orleans, Louisiana
 2016, Charter Award (Merit Award), Currie, Calgary, Alberta, Canada
 2016, Charter Award  (Merit Award) Orleans Landing, Detroit, Michigan

Institute for Classical Architecture and Arts
 2019, Arthur Ross Award for Community Design & City Planning  

Presidential Design Award
 1995, Federal Design Achievement Award, The Re-design of Diggs Town (Public Housing), Norfolk, Virginia 

Urban Land Institute 
 2004, Award of Excellence, Fall Creek Place, Indianapolis, Indiana
 2004, Award of Excellence, First Ward Place/ The Garden District, Charlotte, North Carolina
 2004, Award of Excellence, WaterColor, Seagrove Beach, Florida
 2017-2018, Global Award, West Don Lands, Toronto, Ontario, Canada 

American Institute of Certified Planners (AICP) 
 2011, Donald Hunter Excellence in Economic Development Planning Award, Coliseum District Master Plan: Peninsula Town Center Project, Hampton, Virginia
 2013, National Planning Excellence Award for Implementation, Cincinnati Central Riverfront, Master Plan, Cincinnati, Ohio

City of Moscow
 2012, First Prize, Federal District Concept Plan, International Competition for the Moscow Agglomeration Plan 

Toronto Architecture & Urban Design
 2005, Award of Excellence, Visions and Master Plans, West Don Lands Precinct Plan, Toronto, Ontario, Canada

See also
New Urbanism
Mixed-income housing
HOPE VI

References

Design companies established in 1964
Companies based in Pittsburgh
Architecture firms of the United States
New Urbanism
New Classical architecture
1964 establishments in Pennsylvania